This is a list of the programmes broadcast by Zee Telugu, an Indian Telugu-language general entertainment network.

Current programming

Spiritual shows

Drama

Reality

Former programming

Soap operas 
 Aamani
 Agnipariksha (2021–2022)
 Attarintlo Akka Chellellu (2019–2021)
 America Ammayi (2015–2018)
 Amma Naa Kodala (2014–2017)
 Aparadhi (2004)
 Arundathi (2010–2012)
 Bangaru Gajulu (2019–2020)
 Bava Maradallu (2018–2019)
 Bhama Sathyabhama
 Brindavanam (2013–2014)
 Chinna Kodalu (2010–2013)
 Dr. Chakravarthy (2010–2012)
 Edadugulu
 Evare Nuvvu Mohini (2017–2018)
 Ganga Manga (2018–2020)
 Gangatho Rambabu (2013–2015)
 Geethanjali (2016)
 Goranta Deepam (2013–2014)
 Gruhapravesam (2017–2019)
 Happy Days (Season 1 and 2) (2010–2011)
 Hitler Gari Pellam (2020–2022)
 Iddaru Ammayilu (2015–2017)
 Inti Guttu (2020–2022)
 Inspector Kiran (2017–2020)
 Itlu Prematho Amma
 Kalyana Vaibhogam (2017-2023) Kalavari Kodallu (2011–2014)
 Kanyadanam (2011–2012)
 Kodallu Meeku Joharlu (2022-2023)                                                                                                                                         
 Khushi (2004)                                                                                                                                       
 Kitiki Krishna Tulasi (2021-2022)                                                                                                                                                      
 Konchem Ishtam Konchem Kashtam (2014–2016)
 Krishnavatharalu Unlimited (2010–2011)                                                                                                                               
 Logili Maate Mantramu (2018–2020)
 Maha Devi (2010)
 Malleshwari (2006–2007)
 Mangamma Gari Manavaralu (2013–2017)
 Manoharam Meenakshi (2019)
 Mounaraagam Mr. Romeo Muddha Mandaram Muddu Bidda (2009–2014)
 Muga Manasulu (2014–2017)
 Mutyala Muggu (2016–2019)
 Muthyamantha Muddu (2021–2022)
 My Name is Mangatayaaru (2008–2009)
 Na Kodalu Bangaram (2017–2019)
 Naga Bhairavi (2020–2021)
 Nako Kodalu Kavali (2004–2005)
 Neneu Aayana Aaruguru Attalu (2014)
 Ninne Pelladatha (2018–2021)
 Nishabdham (2005)
 No.1 Kodalu (2019-2022)
 Pakkinti Ammayi (2016–2017)
 Pasupu Kumkuma (2010–2014)
 Peddarikam (2004)
 Pelli Nati Paramanaalu (2012–2014)
 Police Diary (2013–2018)
 Prema (2018–2020)
 Priyadarshini Punnaga (2017–2018)
 Raama Seetha Ekkada (2014–2017)
 Rama Sakkani Seetha (2019-2021)
 Radha Kalyanam (2011-2013)
 Raktha Sambandham (2018–2021)
 Rowdy Gari Pellam (2021-2022)
 Sandade Sandadi (2010)
 Shirdi Sai Katha Sriram Weds Janakiraghuram (2008–2009)
 Suryavamsham (2017–2020)
 Swarna Palace (2021)
 That is Mahalakshmi (2017–2018)
 The Agencie (2004)
 Tholi Prema (2009)
 Thoorpu Padamara (2020)
 Trishulam Ummadi Kutumbam Varudhini Parinayam (2013–2016)
 Vijay Samrat   (2004)

 Dubbed soap operas 
 Aame Anveshana Ardhangi Attarintlo Aiduguru Kodallu Bandham Leni Anubandham Bhethala Vikramarka Brahmarakshasudu Charandasi Durga 
 Gangaa (Telugu)
 Jai Ganesha Jai Santoshi Mata 
 Jaya Krishna Mukunda Murari Jodha Akbar (Telugu)
 Kumkuma Bhagya Maa Vaaru Mangalya Bhagyam Mayavi Meena Meera Oka Raju Oka Rani Pournami Prema Sankellu Punar Vivaaham Ramayanam Rudra Sahana Shivaranjini Shree (Telugu)
 Sri Raghavendra Vaibhavam Tenali Ramakrishna Thulasi Veernaari Jhansi Lakshmi Acquired series 

NB: Abhilasha telecasted on Zee Telugu is a serial that Gemini TV telecasted during the 2000s, henceforth it should not be confused with the 2019 Gemini TV Series Abhilasha.

 Reality and non-scripted shows 
 Adbutham Atta Juniors Bathuku Jataka Bandi Bhagyalakshmi Bumper Offer Big Celebrity Challenge (Season 1 and 2)
 Big Celebrity Challenge International Bindaas Booma Adirindi Bumper Offer Chittam Chittam Prayaschittam Comedy Club Comedy Khiladeelu Drama Juniors (Telugu) (Season 1, 2 and 3)
 Gadasari Atha Sogasari Kodalu (Season 1 and 2)
 Gold Rush Konchem Touch Lo Unte Chepta (Season 1 to 4)
 Konchem Touch Lo Unte Chepta – Super Sunday Kondaveeti Raja Kotalo Rani 
 Lakshmi Rave Maa Intiki Lakshmidevi Talupu Tattindi Local Gangs Lockdown Talks with Ravi Maharani Mondi Mogudu Penki Pellam Omkaram Yogam Kesham 
 Pelli Pustakam Pradeep Darbar Raasi’s Lakku Kikku Race Sa Re Ga Ma Pa Telugu (Season 1 to 12)
 Sa Re Ga Ma Pa L'il Champs – Telugu 2018Sa Re Ga Ma Pa The Next Singing ICONSa Re Ga Ma Pa The Singing Superstar Shubodayam Super Mom Super Serial Championship (Season 1 and 2)
 Teenmar Vah Reh Vah Zee Heroes''

References 

Zee Telugu